Teenage Mutant Ninja Turtles (initially known as Teenage Mutant Hero Turtles in some European countries) is an American animated television series produced by Fred Wolf Films, and based on the comic book characters created by Kevin Eastman and Peter Laird. Set in New York City, the series follows the adventures of the Teenage Mutant Ninja Turtles and their allies as they battle the Shredder, Krang, and numerous other villains and criminals. The property was changed considerably from the darker-toned comics, to make it more suitable for children and the family.

The pilot was shown during the week of December 14, 1987 in syndication as a five-part miniseries, and the show began its full-time run on October 1, 1988. The series ran until November 2, 1996, when it aired its final episode. The show was the first television appearance of the Teenage Mutant Ninja Turtles, and helped launch the characters into mainstream popularity, becoming one of the most popular animated series in television history. Action figures, breakfast cereals, plush toys, and other merchandise featuring the characters appeared on the market during the late-1980s and early-1990s, and became top-sellers worldwide. By 1990, the series was being shown daily on more than 125 television stations.

Characters from the show have been included in crossovers with later entries of the franchise, including the 2009 film Turtles Forever and cameos in the 2012 TV series.

Storylines

Seasons 1–7
The origins story in the 1987 television series deviates significantly from the original Mirage Studios comics. In this version, Splinter was formerly human, an honorable ninja master named Hamato Yoshi who studied art history as a hobby. He was banished from the Foot Clan (a Japanese dynasty of ninjas founded by one of his distant ancestors) after one of his students, the power-hungry and seditious Oroku Saki (who resented Yoshi's leadership within the clan and aspired to usurp him), set him up for an offense against a visiting master sensei. Disgraced, Yoshi was forced to leave his native Japan and relocate to New York City, where he began living in the sewers with the rats as his only friends. Saki was given command of the Foot Clan, which he corrupted and transformed into a criminal organization.

Sometime later, Yoshi adopted four turtles after they were accidentally dropped into the sewers by an unnamed boy. He returned from his explorations around New York City one day to find the turtles covered with a strange glowing ooze. This substance caused the turtles, who were most recently exposed to Yoshi, to become humanoid, while Yoshi, who was most recently exposed to sewer rats, became a humanoid rat, and was given the name "Splinter" by the turtles. Yoshi raises the four turtles as his sons and trains them in the art of ninjitsu. He names them Donatello, Leonardo, Michaelangelo, and Raphael, after his favorite Italian renaissance artists.

Oroku Saki eventually leaves Japan and tracks Yoshi to New York City, where he intends to destroy him once and for all. It is also around this time that he begins working with Krang, a disembodied alien brain from Dimension X who ruled his native realm with an iron fist until he was stripped of his body and banished to Earth. Saki takes on a new pseudonym, "The Shredder", donning a suit covered with razor spikes, and complemented by a long purple cape, a metal samurai helmet, and a metal mask over his mouth. Since leaving Japan, his ambitions have grown from usurping leadership of the Foot Clan to world domination. To this end, Krang provides the Shredder with a vast array of powerful technology from Dimension X, including the Technodrome, and funds most of his schemes throughout the series.

It becomes clear early on in the series that the mutagen which transformed the Turtles and Splinter into their new forms was dumped into the sewers by Shredder in an effort to murder Yoshi, as he had mistakenly believed it to be a deadly poison rather than a transformative agent. After several years of training under Splinter, the Turtles set out to find whoever is responsible for their transformation, and upon learning that Shredder was behind it, they vow to put an end to his ongoing criminal career and restore Splinter back to his human form. Along the way, they rescue and befriend Channel 6 news reporter April O'Neil, who becomes one of their strongest allies. The Turtles, who had rarely left the sewers prior to meeting April, also began to take on the role of semi-vigilante crime fighters. Despite this, they frequently have to deal with citizens misunderstanding them, largely due to the efforts of Channel 6 newsmen Burne Thompson and Vernon Fenwick, who both distrust the Turtles and frequently and wrongfully blame them for the trouble that Shredder and Krang cause. As a result, they mainly have to rely on April (either via Turtle-com, or Channel 6 news reports) to inform them of crimes in the city, and to counteract Burne and Vernon's smear and bad-tempered campaigns against them with her own news coverage of the Turtles, portraying them as a force for good. Reluctant to expose themselves to the outside world, the Turtles initially wear disguises whenever they leave the sewers, although this is slowly relaxed as the series progresses and they gain the trust of the broader populace, whom they have saved from Shredder and other villains on many occasions.

Shredder, Krang, Bebop & Rocksteady, Baxter Stockman, and their legions of Foot soldiers repeatedly try to destroy the Turtles and take over the world. Much of their quest for world domination hinges on repowering Krang's mobile fortress, the Technodrome, and bringing it to the Earth's surface, as it was either buried deep under New York City (season 1), stuck in Dimension X (seasons 2 and 4), embedded in the Earth's core (season 3), stranded in the Arctic (season 5), or at the bottom of the Arctic Ocean (seasons 6 and 7). However, their plans always fail, often landing the villains in humorous predicaments. Some episodes feature other minor villains, such as the Rat King, Leatherhead, Slash, General Traag and Granitor, and many others, or involve the TMNT getting themselves and the city out of a mess that they had inadvertently caused.

Seasons 8–10
In the last three seasons, the show went through dramatic changes. The humor was toned down significantly, the animation became darker, the color of the sky in each episode was changed to a continuous, ominous dark-red sky (commonplace with newer action-oriented children's programming at the time), the theme song was changed, the introduction sequence added in clips from the first live-action film, and the show took on a darker, more action-oriented atmosphere. The Turtles' demeanor evolved into a more serious and determined one than in prior seasons, and they devoted most of their time to tracking down villains. The series' main antagonists—Shredder, Krang, Bebop, and Rocksteady—who had previously been depicted as dangerous but comically inept villains, were now portrayed as a more menacing, unified threat. Additionally, Krang was revealed to have seized power in Dimension X through numerous betrayals and widespread destruction, resulting in old enemies seeking vengeance. Many recurring characters and villains were written out of the show by this point, with more focus placed on the main cast. The season was also noted for the destruction of the Channel 6 building, which led to April working freelance.

At the end of the seventh season, the Turtles sent the Technodrome through a portal into Dimension X, but without Shredder, Krang, Bebop, and Rocksteady. As a result, the villains were stranded on Earth without any weapons or power, and were forced to work out of an old science building until they can find a way back into Dimension X and retrieve the Technodrome. The Turtles, taking advantage of the situation, relentlessly pursue their arch enemies in an effort to put an end to their schemes once and for all. Eventually, Shredder and Krang, along with Bebop and Rocksteady, build a new portal into Dimension X and reclaim the Technodrome, although the Turtles manage to track them down with the help of Gargon, a mutated resident of Dimension X who was being held prisoner by Shredder and Krang. At the end of season 8, the TMNT finally banish Shredder, Krang, Bebop, and Rocksteady to Dimension X by destroying the Technodrome's engines and trans-dimensional portal, preventing them from returning to Earth.

From season 9 onwards, Lord Dregg, an evil alien warlord from Dimension X, appeared as the new lead villain. He begins a propaganda campaign against the Turtles, turning the general population against them and in favor of him and his forces. Although Dregg is outed as a villain at the end of season 9, the Turtles are never able to regain the trust of the broader population, due to an earlier smear campaign by Burne and Vernon that wrongfully blamed the Turtles for the destruction of the Channel 6 building. Additionally, the Turtles began to suffer from mutations that temporarily transformed them into monstrous hulks with diminished intelligence, a problem that would not be completely resolved until season 10. The TMNT also gain a new ally in the form of Carter, a brash African American male who initially sought out Master Splinter for training in ninjitsu, but is eventually exposed to mutagen and contracts an incurable mutation disease.

In the final season of the series, Dregg's sycophantic henchman Mung encounters Shredder and Krang, who are still stranded in Dimension X. They told him that they had battled the Turtles for years, but even though Shredder claimed to have destroyed them, Mung knew that he was lying. Soon afterward, Mung returns to Dregg's ship and informs him of their encounter, and Dregg decides to bring both Shredder and Krang back from Dimension X to help him fight the Turtles. However, the pair immediately rebel against Dregg and leave, continuing on where they left off before they were banished at the end of season 8. Back on Earth, Shredder and Krang kidnap April O'Neil and do battle with the Turtles once more, although they are all soon transported back to Dregg's lair. The Turtles initially have the upper hand in the fight, but Shredder and Krang are able to subdue them after reluctantly agreeing to work with Dregg. As he prepares to drain the Turtles of their life energies, Shredder and Krang betray Lord Dregg and force him onto one of the operating tables, intending to drain both him and the Turtles of their power. Dregg, however, manages to escape and uses his microbots to capture Shredder and Krang. Although he successfully drains the Turtles and Krang of their life energies, Shredder breaks free before Dregg is able to take anything from him. Shredder spends the next two episodes finding a way to heal Krang and dispose of Dregg so that they may take control of his armies and conquer the Earth, but in the ensuing confrontation they are permanently transported back to Dimension X. Carter also bids farewell to the Turtles as he travels to the future to look for a cure for his mutation. In the final episode of the series, Michaelangelo and Donatello travel to Dimension X to retrieve Krang's mechanical body from the (now abandoned and completely destroyed) Technodrome, which is sitting on a hill standing upright (whereas at the end of season 8, an alien plant had dragged it down into a deep pit), suggesting that Shredder and Krang initially tried to repair the Technodrome before declaring it a lost cause. Shredder, Krang, Bebop, and Rocksteady are nowhere to be seen. The Turtles eventually find Krang's suit and use it in a final confrontation with Dregg, which ends with the Turtles banishing Dregg to Dimension X. Splinter congratulates the Turtles on their victory and, now that all of their enemies have been vanquished, states that he has nothing more to teach them, calling them his equals.

Subsequent works
In 2009, the Turtles, Shredder, Krang, and various other characters from the 1987 series returned for the 25th-anniversary crossover movie Turtles Forever, in which they meet up with their counterparts from the 2003 TV series. Due to financial restrictions, none of the original voice actors were able to reprise their roles, and replacement actors were used instead.

In April 2013, Ciro Nieli, the executive producer of the 2012 Turtles series, confirmed in an interview that the 1987 Turtles would cameo in a one-hour special in season 2. Cam Clarke, Townsend Coleman, Barry Gordon, and Rob Paulsen (who voiced Donatello in the 2012 series) reprise their roles as Leonardo, Michaelangelo, Donatello, and Raphael, respectively, in the closing of the episode "Wormquake!". The 1987 turtles also had a crossover with the 2012 turtles in the season 4 episode, "Trans-Dimensional Turtles". In addition with the lead cast members reprising their roles from the episode, Pat Fraley also reprised his role as Krang who is depicted as a relative of Kraang Subprime that was banished to Earth in the 1980s reality for being incompetent. The 1987 turtles also returned during season five of the 2012 series for a three-part special, "Wanted: Bebop and Rocksteady", along with the original Shredder, Foot soldiers, Krang, Technodrome, and both Bebop and Rocksteady. Both Gordon and Clarke reprised their roles as Bebop and Rocksteady, while the Shredder is voiced by the 2012 incarnation's voice actor Kevin Michael Richardson, due to James Avery's passing in 2013.

Episodes

Production

Development and writing
By 1986, the Teenage Mutant Ninja Turtles comic series by Kevin Eastman and Peter Laird had experienced two years of success. At that time, New York-based licensing agent Mark Freedman – who had previously handled Hanna-Barbera's library of characters and was establishing his own licensing company – was contacted by a connection in the toy industry and introduced to the property. Though initially in disbelief at the title, he found it growing onto him and decided to approach California toy manufacturer Playmates Toys to pitch a toy line based on the property. The uncertain company requested that a television deal be acquired first, and after the initial five-episode series debuted, they released their first series of Ninja Turtles action figures in the summer of 1988. The two media would correspond in marketing and popularity for many years to come.

David Wise and Patti Howeth wrote the screenplay for the first 5-part miniseries.  When the series continued in the second season, comic artist Jack Mendelsohn joined the show as the executive story editor.  Wise went on to write over seventy episodes of the series, and was executive story editor for four later seasons as well. Wise left the series partway through the ninth season, and Jeffrey Scott took over as the story editor and chief writer for the rest of the show's run.

The animation work for the early episodes of the series were handled by Japanese anime studio Toei Animation. The budget for the first five episodes of the series was almost $2 million.

Voice acting
Casting for the show took place in Los Angeles. During recording of the voice acting, all the main cast recorded together. According to Renae Jacobs, voice-actress of the reporter April O'Neil, working together "was great for camaraderie and relationships. We played off each other...there was a lot of ad libbing".

Also according to Jacobs, the actors frequently undermined the efforts of the show's creators to make the show grittier and more serious, instead embracing silliness and jokes for both children and adults.

Characters

Teenage Mutant Ninja Turtles
 Leonardo (voiced by Cam Clarke) – The blue-masked turtle who wields two katana. He is the leader and commander of the Turtles and is the closest to Splinter. He is the most serious, level-headed member of the team, who values his leadership.
 Donatello (voiced by Barry Gordon in most episodes, Greg Berg in six Season 3 episodes and one episode of the European side-season) – The purple-masked turtle who wields a bō staff. He is the scientist and intellectual of the team who is constantly tinkering with various inventions. Donatello's capabilities in science and technology have been key factors for the Turtles' successes in their battles with Shredder and other villains.
 Raphael (voiced by Rob Paulsen in Season 1–9, Thom Pinto in Season 3, Hal Rayle in the European side-season, and Michael Gough in Season 10) – The red-masked turtle who wields two sai. Although Raphael is depicted as angry, impulsive, and violent in most other TMNT media, he is the comedian of the team who often comes out with sarcastic and witty remarks in the 1987 series. He provides some of the comic relief for the show, constantly breaking the fourth wall.
 Michaelangelo (voiced by Townsend Coleman) – The orange-masked turtle who wields a pair of nunchakus, which is later changed to a grappling hook. He is the goofy, fun-loving "party animal" of the team who often speaks in surfer slang, and is the source for many of the show's catchphrases, such as "Cowabunga!". More so than any other Turtle, he is obsessed with pizza and enjoys experimenting with various toppings, even when the other Turtles find it gross. He is also considered to be the least intelligent member of the team, especially by Raphael. Michaelangelo is the most laid back character, though he is shown to be very skilled with his nunchaku. He also provides much of the comic relief albeit without Raphael's sarcasm.

Allies and friends
 Hamato Yoshi/Master Splinter (voiced by Peter Renaday in most appearances, Townsend Coleman in two Season 5 episodes) – A soft-spoken yet strict and wizened sensei who used to teach Oroku Saki, until the latter set him up for an offense towards his master which he did not commit and was exiled from the Foot Clan. Since then, he has lived in the sewers of Manhattan as a homeless man with the rats and his four pet turtles as his only friends. Upon being exposed to the same mutagen that changed the turtles into their present anthropomorphic forms, Hamato Yoshi transformed into a humanoid mutant rat (as he had most recently been exposed to rats) and trained the Turtles in ninjutsu. It is later revealed that one of his distant ancestors is the founder of the Foot Clan.
 April O'Neil (voiced by Renae Jacobs) – A redheaded TV reporter from Channel 6 News (later a freelance reporter in Seasons 9 and 10) who discovers the Turtles' home in the sewers and befriends the TMNT. She is frequently kidnapped by Shredder and other villains, usually as bait to lure the Turtles out of hiding.
 Irma Langinstein (voiced by Jennifer Darling) – Channel 6's clumsy, dating-obsessed secretary who debuts in season 2. She is April's best friend who later also befriends the TMNT. Following the destruction of the Channel 6 Building in season 8, Irma is slowly phased out of the show. A similar character would be used in the 2012 series.
 Casey Jones (voiced by Pat Fraley) – A violent, impulsive, and overzealous street-fighting vigilante who is friends with the Ninja Turtles. He fights using sports equipment and wears a hockey mask.
 Zach "the Fifth Turtle" (voiced by Rob Paulsen) – A 14-year-old who looks up to the Turtles and is their biggest fan.
 Caitlin (voiced by Maggie Roswell) – A female teenage friend of Zach.
 Aunt Aggie (voiced by Joan Gerber) – April's detective aunt who occasionally helps the Turtles defeat their enemies. She also runs a popular crime TV show.
 The Punk Frogs – The mutant frog counterparts of the Teenage Mutant Ninja Turtles who were accidentally mutated by Krang and trained in martial arts in the hopes that they would be a match for the Turtles. Further emulating his rival Splinter, Shredder names the four frogs after his own personal heroes: Attila the Hun, Genghis Khan, Napoleon Bonaparte, and Grigori Rasputin. Despite their innocent, docile nature, they are also extremely naive, and as such, they were easily misled by Shredder into believing that the Turtles were "evil" and that Shredder was a "good person". However, they eventually turned against Shredder and became allies of the Ninja Turtles. The frogs all speak with Southern American accents.
 Attila the Frog (voiced by Townsend Coleman) – A Punk Frog that is armed with a mace who is named after Attila the Hun.
 Genghis Frog (voiced by Jim Cummings) – A Punk Frog that is armed with an axe who is named after Genghis Khan.
 Napoleon Bonafrog (voiced by Pat Fraley) – A Punk Frog that is armed with a whip who is named after Napoleon Bonaparte.
 Rasputin the Mad Frog (voiced by Nicholas Omana) – A Punk Frog that is armed with a bow and arrow who is named after Grigori Rasputin.
 The Neutrinos – An alien race of teenagers from Dimension X whose only goal in life is to have fun.
 Zenter and Grizzla (voiced by Rob Paulsen and Jennifer Darling respectively) – The leaders of the Neutrinos.
 Dask (voiced by Thom Pinto)
 Kala (voiced by Tress MacNeille)
 Zak (voiced by Pat Fraley)
 Muckman and Joe Eyeball (voiced by Townsend Coleman impersonating Jackie Gleason and Rob Paulsen impersonating Art Carney respectively) – Garson Grunge and Joe Junkee are two garbage men who were mutated by a substance poured out of a window by Bebop and Rocksteady. Garson mutated into a man-shaped garbage creature while Joe mutated into a small green creature with eye-stalks. They mistakenly thought that the Turtles had caused them to mutate, but when the latter were found innocent, Muckman & Joe Eyeball helped them rescue Splinter from the Technodrome.
 Usagi Yojimbo (voiced by Townsend Coleman) – A samurai rabbit and master swordsman from an alternate dimension's 16th century Edo Period Japan where animals are the dominant species on Earth and not the humans. He is from the Usagi Yojimbo comics that were created by Stan Sakai starring the ronin hero rabbit Miyamoto Usagi which had several crossovers with the TMNT comics.
 Kerma (voiced by Jan Rabson) – A native of the distant utopian planet Shell-Ri-La (the name being a pun on Shangri-La) which is home to a peaceful, but generally defenseless species of humanoid turtles called Turtleoids. He arrives on Earth seeking the Turtles' help in protecting his home planet from various threats. Kerma's voice and personality are extremely similar to that of Jiminy Cricket.
 Bugman (voiced by Dan Gilvezan) – Brick Bradley is a scientist who got caught up in a mutant experiment and can now mutate into a large insect when angered. As Bugman, Brick had the eyes, antennae, wings, and extra arms of a fly, and the tail of a scorpion. Michaelangelo was a fan of Bugman and first encountered him in "Michaelangelo Meets Bugman" where he helped him fight Electrozapper. In "Michaelangelo Meets Bugman Again", Michaelangelo and Bugman faced off against the Swatter.
 Mona Lisa (voiced by Pat Musick) – A college girl who is a physics major that was captured by Captain Filch so that he can have her help in his experiments. While trying to destroy his nuclear reactor, Mona Lisa was turned into a mutant lizard. She appeared to be romantically interested in Raphael and appears in "Raphael Meets His Match". Although she followed the Turtles back to New York at the conclusion of the same episode, she is not seen again afterwards.
 Buffy Shellhammer (voiced by Jennifer Darling) – The bratty 15-year-old director of Shellhammer Chemicals. She was kidnapped by Bebop and Rocksteady in order to get a formula for rocket fuel needed to free the Technodrome. Their plans were foiled by the Turtles.
 Hokum Hare (voiced by Townsend Coleman) - He is first seen in the episode "The Turtles and the Hare" where Krang creates a Dosilizer ray to turn everyone on Earth into "timid rabbits". The Turtles need a Cyranium Crystal to return things back to normal. It is located in a fairy tale dimension which is Hokum's home.
 Rex-1 (voiced by Jack Angel) – A robot police officer built to keep crimes out of the city.
 Carter (voiced by Bumper Robinson) – Introduced in season nine, he travels to New York City to study martial arts under Splinter, but is accidentally exposed to a mutagen which causes him to spontaneously oscillate between his human and mutant forms. He was an important ally to the TMNT in their battles against Lord Dregg. In season 10, he temporarily leaves to finish his studies after Donatello stabilized his mutation, although he returns upon learning from April that the Turtles were captured by Lord Dregg, Krang, and Shredder. While on his way to rescue the Turtles, Carter found that he could still mutate. At the end of "Turtles to the Second Power", Carter accepts Landor and Merrick's offer to travel with them to the future so he can be fully cured of his mutation.

Villains

 Foot Clan - The Foot Clan is an evil ninja organization.
 Oroku Saki/The Shredder (voiced by James Avery in Season 1 to the first half of Season 7, Dorian Harewood in four Season 3 episodes, Pat Fraley in one Season 3 episode, Jim Cummings in one Season 5 episode and most of the European side-season, Townsend Coleman for the second half of Season 7, William E. Martin from Season 8–10) – The nemesis of the Turtles and Master Splinter. He is usually the main villain in other media, but in this series Shredder always, against his will, has to take orders from Krang, although their relationship evolves over time into more of an equal partnership (with Shredder even risking his life to save Krang on numerous occasions). His real name is Oroku Saki, a member of the Foot Clan in Japan and a student of Hamato Yoshi/Splinter. Saki was jealous of Yoshi's leadership within the Clan and sought to usurp him. He responds by framing Yoshi for an offense towards the sensei and has him exiled. Shortly afterwards, Saki takes control of the Foot Clan and transforms it into an army of crime under his command. Along with Krang, Rocksteady, and Bebop, he is the primary antagonist of the show until the end of season 8, when the Technodrome is destroyed and they are all banished to Dimension X. Although he and Krang return for 3 episodes in the final season, they are eventually sent back to Dimension X, and they are not seen again for the rest of the series.
 Rocksteady (voiced by Cam Clarke) – Rocksteady is one of Shredder's incompetent, oafish henchmen. Originally the Caucasian male leader of an unnamed street gang, Rocksteady was exposed to the mutagen after coming into contact with a black rhinoceros that was stolen from the zoo, transforming him into a humanoid black rhinoceros. Like Bebop, he is extremely unintelligent (although he is shown on multiple occasions to be slightly more intelligent than Bebop) and serves as comic relief for most of the series.
 Bebop (voiced by Barry Gordon in most episodes, Greg Berg in six Season 3 episodes and one episode of the European side-season) – Bebop is an African-American male with a mohawk, sunglasses, and a nose ring who, along with Rocksteady, is one of Shredder's henchmen. Prior to meeting Shredder, he belonged to the same street gang as Rocksteady, serving as the latter's second-in-command. As part of Shredder and Krang's experiment, he was transformed into a humanoid common warthog after being exposed to the mutagen and a common warthog that was stolen from the zoo. 
 Baxter Stockman (voiced by Pat Fraley) – Baxter Stockman is a blond Caucasian inventor (as opposed to the dark-haired African-American he was portrayed as in the Mirage comics) who tried to bill his rat-catching Mousers to the Ajax Pest Control company. They did not like his suggestion, saying it would put them out of business, and threw him out of the building. Embittered, he readily agrees to join forces with Shredder, who orders him to replicate his Mousers and hunt down Splinter and the Turtles. After the Ninja Turtles defeated the Mousers, Baxter Stockman was arrested and thrown into an asylum. Shredder later traded Baxter Stockman to Krang for the return of Bebop and Rocksteady. When Krang found no use for Stockman and decided to kill him, a fly that had been with Baxter in the disintegrator unit soon merged with him, turning him into a humanoid fly. He has occasionally plotted revenge against the Ninja Turtles and Shredder. Baxter Stockman has a twin brother named Barney who was also a mad scientist and threw fits whenever the Turtles mistook him for Baxter.
 Z (voiced by Townsend Coleman) - The spaceship computer found on an abandoned spaceship that allied with Baxter Stockman where it assisted him in his plots in "Bye, Bye, Fly," "Son of Return of the Fly II," and "Revenge of the Fly."
 Foot Soldiers – A group of robotic ninjas that serve as Shredder's loyal soldiers.
 Alpha One (voiced by Jim Cummings) – A Foot Soldier who had his intelligence increased by Krang and Shredder.
 Krang (voiced by Pat Fraley in most episodes, Townsend Coleman in four Season 3 episodes) – An extremely intelligent, disembodied brain from Dimension X who commands the Technodrome. Like Shredder, he aspires to conquer the Earth, although he does not share Shredder's obsessive hatred of the Turtles and Splinter (instead of viewing them as more of an annoyance/obstacle), preferring instead to focus on world conquest. He funds and helps plan most of Shredder's schemes, although they often bicker with one another over tactics. In season 7, it is revealed that Krang originally belonged to a muscular, vicious reptilian species (mainly resembling a T-Rex) with regenerative powers before he lost his body and was banished from Dimension X.
 Rock Soldiers – The Rock Soldiers are an army of sentient rock humanoids from Dimension X. As mentioned in "Michaelangelo's Birthday," the Rock Soldiers were created when Krang used mutagen on some rocks. The Rock Soldiers are incredibly strong, but they are not very bright.
 General Traag (voiced by Peter Renaday) – Traag is a Rock Soldier general that is loyal to Krang.
 Sergeant Granitor (voiced by Pat Fraley impersonating Peter Lorre) – Granitor is a high-ranking gray Rock Soldier that is loyal to Krang and works under General Traag.
 Unnamed Street Gang - The first street gang is the one that Bebop and Rocksteady lead. There is another branch of the group that is led by Lugnut who Bebop and Rocksteady's faction are associated with. Both factions are loosely based on the Purple Dragons from the comics.
 Scrag - A member of Bebop and Rocksteady's faction who was mutated into a mutant bat. His name came from the original storyboard for "Turtle Tracks" and a coloring book.
 Grunt - A member of Bebop and Rocksteady's faction that sports a yellow mohaw. He was mutated into a mutant lizard. Grunt's name came from the original storyboard for "Turtle Tracks."
 Dopey - A cap-wearing member of Bebop and Rocksteady's faction who was mutated into a mutant shrew. His name came from the original storyboard for "Turtle Tracks."
 Dumbo - A short, fat, and bald-headed member of Bebop and Rocksteady's faction who was mutated into a mutant dog. His name came from the original storyboard for "Turtle Tracks."
 Lugnut (voiced by Townsend Coleman in "The Gang's All Here," Nicholas Omana in "Once Upon a Time Machine") - The bald-headed leader of the gang that Rocksteady and Bebop's faction are a part of.
 Jersey Red (voiced by Renae Jacobs) - A tough woman who is a member of Lugnut's faction.
 High Five (voiced by Rob Paulsen) - A member of Lugnut's faction.
 Rat King (voiced by Townsend Coleman) – Rat King is a homeless man living in a dilapidated portion of the New York City sewer system, not too far from the Turtles and Splinter. In episodes featuring him, the Rat King would often enact some sort of plot to establish his own rat-controlled government and bring human rule to an end, believing that rats (which he counted himself as) were superior to all other species, whom he described as "inferior non-rodents". He appears as a recurring villain from season 3 onwards until he is finally apprehended by the police in the second episode of season 8.
 Leatherhead (voiced by Jim Cummings in most appearances, Peter Renaday in "Night of the Rogues") – Leatherhead is a large alligator from Florida who had mutated into humanoid form when he swam through a mutagen-polluted part of his swamp. He hunted the Turtles' allies the Punk Frogs, and then went to New York to hunt the Turtles themselves. 
 Slash (voiced by Pat Fraley) – Slash was an ordinary turtle from Earth that was mutated by Bebop and Rocksteady. He is a muscular, vicious humanoid turtle with brute strength and surprising agility, but very low intelligence (although he does temporarily acquire a genius level IQ in his second appearance). He is extremely attached to the small, plastic palm tree that stood in his bowl prior to being mutated, and calls it his "binky".
 Metalhead (various voice actors) – A robot turtle that was created by Shredder. He has numerous voices that sound like any of the turtles and has a laser gun installed in his chest. He can also fight by extending his arms and legs. Sometimes, he'd malfunction and attack Shredder and his goons other than just the turtles.
 Pinky McFingers (voiced by Peter Renaday in most appearances, Cam Clarke in "Donatello's Duplicate") – Pinky McFingers is a high ranking mafia boss with a gang at his disposal. McFingers once sponsors Baxter Stockman's twin brother Barney Stockman to create a "gag-a-magnifier" device that increases the comedy power of jokes. They planned to hook up the funniest comedian to it and transmit the joke waves all over the city, making everyone hysterically helpless. This enabled McFingers and his two goons would go out and rob the city. He and his men kidnapped comedians until they kidnapped Raphael. They tied Raphael up in a sack and took him to their hideout where strapped down, McFingers tells him of his brilliant plan. Being the funniest comedian, Raphael is forced to start telling his jokes. However, the rest of the turtles rescue him and the other comedians and turn the device against Stockman and the McFingers gang, all of whom end up arrested.
 Big Louie (voiced by Peter Renaday) – Big Louie is a high ranking gangster with a gang at his disposal, who sometimes works with the Shredder. He's fighting a turf conflict against another gangster group led by Babyface "The Beaver" Cleaver and Wally Cleaver.

 Don Turtelli (voiced by Peter Renaday) – Don Turtelli is the head of the crime syndicate. He is the grandson of Tony "The Tickler" Turtelli. Turtelli went down in infamy for his torture methods, which he inherited from his grandfather. He specializes in the interrogation of people he captures through tickle torturing the soles of his victims' feet with a feather to make them talk.
 Dr. Polidorius (voiced by Alan Oppenheimer) – A mad scientist who created the mutant humanoid fish Ray.
 Ray (voiced by Pat Fraley) – A humanoid fish with manta ray-like wings and an octopus tentacle for a tail. He was created by Dr. Polidorius to serve him and assist with his plans to destroy the city. Ray has many abilities of a fish like the electricity of an electric eel, the quills of a scorpionfish, and the inflation of a blowfish.
 Electrozapper (voiced by Pat Fraley) - An electrical enemy of Bugman.
 Wingnut and Screwloose (voiced by Rob Paulsen and Townsend Coleman respectively) – An alien bat and an alien mosquito who brainwashed kids at a military school to help them invade Earth.
 Groundchuck (voiced by Robert Ridgely) – A mutant red bull in cyborg armor that was accidentally created by Bebop and Rocksteady.
 Dirtbag (voiced by Pat Fraley) – A mutant mole that was accidentally created by Bebop and Rocksteady.
 Chrome Dome (voiced by Peter Renaday) – A huge robot built by Shredder to supervise the Foot Soldiers into building the Technodrome Mark II. The Turtles defeated him by disabling the chip on his back. In "Night of the Rogues," Chrome Dome was reactivated where he is among the villains that helped Shredder and Krang attack the Turtles. He is defeated when Casey Jones crushes him with a hydraulic press.
 The Swatter (voiced by Townsend Coleman) – Jerry Spiegel comic book artist who attempted to steal the Turtles' secrets and publish them to the world only to run afoul of them and Bugman.
 Professor Filo Sopho (voiced by Rob Paulsen) – The head of Sopho University who first attempted to speed up the Earth's rotation in "Donatello's Degree." In "Too Hot to Handle," Professor Sopho tried to move it closer to the sun creating uninhabitable conditions for humans.
 Shreeka (voiced by Joan Gerber) – Krang's former partner in crime who first appears in "Shreeka's Revenge" to reclaim the "power ring" that Krang stole from her.
 Professor Cycloid (voiced by Hamilton Camp) – A crazed professor who stole Donatello's "time stopper" machine in an effort to take over the world.
 Tempestra (voiced by Gaille Heidemann) – Tempestra is a powerful weather-controlling sorceress who came from a video game that she got out of during a thunderstorm. In "Night of the Rogues," Tempestra was among the villains that helped Shredder and Krang attack the Turtles.
 Scumbug (voiced by Barry Gordon) – A mutant cockroach who was among the villains that helped Shredder and Krang attack the Turtles. He was one of the few villains from the Archie Comics series "Teenage Mutant Ninja Turtles Adventures" to appear in the cartoon where the comics revealed that was Scumbug mutated from an exterminator that came in contact with a cockroach in the Technodrome while doing some fumigating.
 Antrax (voiced by Pat Fraley) – An alien ant who works as Krang's executioner. In "Night of the Rogues," Antrax is among the villains that helped Shredder and Krang attack the Turtles.
 Drakus/Berserko (voiced by Jim Cummings) - Krang's weapon engineer.
 H.A.V.O.C. – Short for Highly Advanced Variety Of Creatures, H.A.V.O.C. is a gang of mutants. The Turtles meet H.A.V.O.C. in the process of thwarting a robbery, meeting mutants and H.A.V.O.C. members Raptor, Amok, and Overdrive, and then later, the H.A.V.O.C. leader, Titanus. The Turtles find out that while H.A.V.O.C. has offered the Turtles a safe haven from those who think they are the villains, H.A.V.O.C. is actually creating mutants instead of protecting them and actually tries to turn the entire city into mutants. The Turtles spend a few episodes of season 8 battling H.A.V.O.C. After they get rid of the boss, none of the other mutants appear again.
 Titanus (voiced by Ron Feinberg) – A large mutant from the future who is the leader of H.A.V.O.C. In his final appearance, he ends up trapped in the time of dinosaurs and vows to have revenge against the Turtles if it is the last thing he ever does.
 Amok (voiced by Townsend Coleman) – A mutant goat.
 Highbeam (voiced by Rob Paulsen) – A mutant firefly.
 Magma (voiced by Barry Gordon) – A lava mutant. He and Seizure were used by Titanus to make mutants.
 Overdrive (voiced by Cam Clarke) – A mutant cheetah.
 Ram Mystic (voiced by Rob Paulsen) - An unnamed ram mutant with mystical powers.
 Raptor (voiced by Pat Fraley) – A mutant bird.
 Seizure (voiced by Rodger Bumpass) – A mutant centipede. He and Magma were used by Titanus to make mutants.
 Synapse (voiced by Pat Fraley) – A convict that desired revenge against the Turtles since they defeated him in "Get Shredder." In H.A.V.O.C. in the Streets, Titanus breaks him out of jail and turns him into an electric mutant. Synapse keeps the Turtles busy for a while until Donatello forces him through a ham radio, leaving him trapped on the radio airwaves forever.
 Lord Dregg (voiced by Tony Jay) – An alien warlord who serves as the chief antagonist for the final two seasons of the series, following Shredder and Krang's exile to Dimension X in season 8. At the end of the final season, Lord Dregg is banished to Dimension X as well (and is presumably killed, since the Turtles had sent Krang's android suit back with him as it was about to undergo an atomic explosion). Although he starts out as a cold, calm, and calculating villain, his sanity gradually deteriorates over the course of season 10, as he becomes increasingly obsessed with destroying the Turtles once and for all. In the process, he alienates all of his remaining followers, including his second-in-command Mung, who accuses him of losing sight of their quest for world domination. He is the only villain other then Titanus who is part of Seasons 8–10 to appear in more than one episode.
 HiTech (voiced by Rob Paulsen in Season 9, Cam Clarke in Season 10) – An insect-like alien in high tech armor who is Lord Dregg's second-in-command. When Mung proves more efficient as second-in-command, Lord Dregg blasts HiTech off in a pod to "orbit the galaxy".
 Mung (voiced by Cam Clarke) – A hunchbacked beetle-like henchman of Lord Dregg who replaced HiTech in the final season. He is a technical and mechanical genius where he surpasses HiTech. Mung is left to die by Dregg, and is heavily implied to have been devoured by his own nanobots.
 TechnoGang – A gang of insect-like foot soldiers that serve Lord Dregg.
 Batmen – A group of ugly winged humanoid that serve as the alternate foot soldiers for Lord Dregg.

Other characters
 Channel 6 News Staff – The workers of Channel 6 News that often have involvements with the Ninja Turtles. Following the destruction of the Channel 6 News building during Season 8, these characters slowly faded out of the show. The old Channel 6 building also made a cameo appearance in the crossover movie Turtles Forever as the 2003 Turtles take a detour in the dimension of their 1987 counterparts.
 Burne Thompson (voiced by Pat Fraley in most episodes, Townsend Coleman in three episodes of Season 3) – April's stubborn and irascible  boss at Channel 6 News, and the human antagonist of the Turtles. Like J. Jonah Jameson, he wrongfully believed the Turtles were a menace and encouraged April to expose them since he usually had to pay for the damages caused by the Turtles' battles. His hatred for the TMNT intensified following the destruction of the Channel 6 building by Shredder in season 8, an incident he falsely blamed on the Turtles. He often favored Vernon more, which was likely due to the fact that Vernon shared Burne's distrust of the TMNT and did not hesitate to cast a negative light on them in his news coverage. In the 2014 Teenage Mutant Ninja Turtles film, a female adaption of this character named Bernadette Thompson was used where she was portrayed by Whoopi Goldberg.
 Vernon Fenwick (voiced by Pat Fraley in season 1, Peter Renaday in seasons 2-8 and Townsend Coleman in one season 5 episode) – April's cameraman, rival news reporter, and the second human antagonist of the Turtles. In season 1, he had more of a serious and dedicated personality, although shades of the cowardice and rivalry with April that would define Vernon's character throughout the rest of the series would sometimes surface. Despite that, he was still willing to help April get her story in the season 1 finale, "Shredded and Splintered". From season 2 onwards, he was written as a selfish, egotistical, opportunistic, and cowardly cameraman and co-reporter who would often go to great lengths to steal April's thunder, although he was quick to cede all of the more "dangerous" assignments to April, not willing to put himself in harm's way. Like Burne, he strongly believed that the Turtles were a menace to society and often actively participated in Burne's anti-mutant campaigns, even though the Turtles had saved his life on many occasions. Vern appears in the 2014 TMNT film and its 2016 sequel portrayed by Will Arnett.
 O.M.N.S.S. (voiced by Peter Renaday) - A source of artificial intelligence from a fragment of the Eye of Zarnoth. Encountered in "The Mean Machines" by Shredder and Baxter Stockman who used it to destroy the Turtles.

Soundtrack
Through most of the series, the episodes featured a recurring background music which reflected the mood of the situation, as well as ID music for settings such as the Technodrome, the New York City sewers, Channel 6, etc.. The soundtrack was composed by Dennis Challen Brown (credited as "D.C. Brown" and later as "Dennis C. Brown") and Chuck Lorre. Lorre recorded the theme song (and performed the spoken parts) and later became a successful television producer. The performer of the song was James Mandell (aka Miles Doppler). To date the soundtrack has never been released for retail.

The Channel 6 News theme music also appeared in the Turtles in Time video game.

Broadcast and release

Syndication
The show was in Saturday morning syndication from October 1, 1988, to September 9, 1989, and became an instant hit. The show was expanded to five days a week and aired weekday afternoons in syndication in most markets from September 25, 1989, to March 29, 1991, with reruns airing until September 17, 1993. Starting on September 8, 1990 (with a different opening sequence), the show began its secondary run on CBS's Saturday morning lineup, beginning as a 60-minute block from 1990 to 1993, initially airing a couple of Saturday exclusive episodes back to back. There would also be a brief "Turtle Tips" segment in between the two episodes which served as public service announcements about the environment or other issues. There were at least 20 "Turtle Tips" segments that were produced and aired. Beginning in 1994, the show began airing as a 30-minute block until the series ended.

International
Reruns of the series were broadcast weekly on Teletoon Retro in Canada until the channel was shutdown on September 1, 2015. Although the last episode broadcast on CBS on November 2, 1996, reruns of Seasons 8, 9 and 10 continued to air until August 30, 1997. The series previously reran in North America in Quebec on Super Écran, who rebroadcast the entire series from 2006 to 2008. Episodes from Seasons 1–7 were rerun on the USA Network's USA Cartoon Express from September 13, 1993, to September 15, 1996 (which was the last time to date any episode from prior to Seasons 8-10 aired on television in the United States). Fred Wolf Films, owners of the rights to the show, have licensed the series to Lionsgate Home Entertainment, who have been responsible for the DVD and retail streaming releases.

In the Republic of Ireland, the series ended its original run on August 9, 1998, but the show was regularly rerun on RTÉ Two until 2008. In Yugoslavia the series was broadcast on RTS from 1991 - 1994 and on RTV Pink from 1998 - 2002. In Denmark, the show is aired every weekday at 6.00 am on TV 2.

In the Republic of Ireland, the series was initially known as Teenage Mutant Ninja Turtles just like the US version and the intro sequence was unedited when it debuted on RTÉ Two as part of the Irish TV strand The Den with the airing of the second season in September 1990. After the first two episodes were broadcast, the name was changed to the Hero Turtles version and the intro was edited, except for season one. Scenes with Mikey's nunchucks and the word ‘ninja’ were always edited out in the actual episodes, though. Episodes were also cut a bit midway through at the point where there would be a commercial break, perhaps because there were no ad breaks during shows on The Den. The show was very popular in Ireland and aired a lot on weekday afternoons on RTÉ in the mid 90s with season 1 being placed between 3 and 4. The European Vacation eps first aired in Ireland in December 1990. In 2007–2008, episodes were aired in their original US unedited form.

In the UK, the series premiered on Children's BBC in January 1990, initially airing on Wednesday afternoons before moving to Tuesday afternoons. Airings continued throughout most of the 90s, ending in 1997. The programme resurfaced from 2002 to 2004 on the CBBC Channel and CBBC Two. The program also gained airings on 90s Saturday morning kids show Going Live!. It was also once aired on Nickelodeon in the United Kingdom and Ireland between 1993 and 1997.

In the United Kingdom, the series was originally released under the name Teenage Mutant Hero Turtles (TMHT). This was due to the controversy surrounding ninjas and related weapons such as nunchaku at the time. The intro sequence was heavily edited because of this, replacing the word ninja with hero or fighting, using a digitally faded logo instead of the animated blob, and removing any scenes in which Michaelangelo wields his nunchaku, replacing them with clips from the show. Scenes of Michaelangelo using his nunchaku were likewise edited out of the episodes themselves, which led the American show runners to drop the weapons from the series entirely in the fourth season in order to make the show more appropriate for the international airings. The weapons were replaced with a grappling hook called the "Turtle Line" that served as Mikey's signature weapon for the rest of the show's run. The word 'ninja' was also edited out of any speech within the show, often leading to some awkward sounding dialogue.

When shown on the BBC, phrases such as "Let's kick some shell!" and "Bummer!" were removed from the episodes (the latter may relate to a British slang term for anal sex). The series Ninja Turtles: The Next Mutation was also referred to as Hero Turtles, possibly using the term hero to separate the television series from the live action movies. The 2003 television series, however, remained intact when shown in the UK and the Republic of Ireland. This led the UK and the Republic of Ireland to have a disambiguation between the two animated series, using Hero Turtles to separate the 1987 television series from the other incarnations of the franchise. In 2009, a DVD of the first two seasons was released under the Ninja Turtles branding, thus bringing this version of the franchise into line with the later versions.

The TMHT version was aired in other European countries, including the Republic of Ireland (except series 1, which had the original title), The Netherlands, Belgium, Germany, Austria, Poland, Hungary, Sweden, Norway, Denmark, and Finland, in local dubs (the Finnish version was in English with subtitles, while Polish was in English with a voice-over translation). In Denmark, the English censored version was aired on the national broadcaster TV2. It had subtitles as well, however, only seasons 2 and 3 were aired in this fashion. Season 1 was aired as one spliced feature, instead of the original five-part miniseries. The movie was titled The Epic Begins, and included heavy edits from each of the five episodes, and was also released to VHS in the US in 1988.

After the 2 seasons had aired on Danish TV, the show was cancelled; however, it later returned with local dubs of episodes from season 5, and Denmark was also one of the first countries to get to see the episodes in which the turtles travel to Europe. These were also aired with subtitles.

The original series aired in early 2011 during the early morning hours on TV2 in Denmark. All 193 episodes have been re-dubbed, and this time they aired in their original US unedited form.

In Russia on the TV channel 2×2 a dubbed version in Russian was shown on September 25, 1993. On June 9, 1997, the channel shut down, and the show was discontinued. After it resumed broadcasting in 2003, a re-run with an old dubbed version began on the 2×2 from April 1, 2013. Since February 11, 2021, there is a new dubbed version on TV channel 2x2.

In Sweden, TV 3 Sweden, which aired from London, aired seasons 1-3 between 1990 and 1993, while TV1000 aired seasons 4–6 with subtitles and the "Vacation in Europe" episodes dubbed. The series was dubbed into Swedish by Mediadubb. Sun Studio also dubbed some chosen seasons 1-3 episodes into Swedish, for home video releases in 1991, later rereleased to DVD. In Sweden, the home video releases kept the original title, "Teenage Mutant Ninja Turtles".

In Spain, the name of the cartoon was translated to Las Tortugas Ninja (with the word ninja in the title), but at first the TMHT version was still used for dubbing, although the word ninja was kept in several instances of the dub, and the original TMNT version was also alternatively aired afterwards. Other European countries (including Bulgaria, France, Italy, Yugoslavia and Turkey) dubbed the original TMNT version. In Yugoslavia, the series was re-dubbed into Serbian with Prizor sincronization for TV Pink as Teenage Mutant Hero Turtles (1998).

In Australia, the show's original run on the Seven Network ended in 1996. From 2013 to 2020, reruns aired on 10 Peach.

Despite being a PAL region, the series always aired under the US “Ninja” title in Australia. The first season of the show premiered as a two-part (90 minutes each) prime-time miniseries on the Seven Network in February 1990 before shifting to a 3:30 p.m. timeslot for Season 2.  Later, after ratings fell, it was moved to a morning timeslot in January 1994 as part of Agro's Cartoon Connection until its end in 1996. The show was mostly uncensored, airing under its original name with occasional edits, including the editing of Season 1.

In New Zealand the series screened on TV3 from early 1990 onwards, just weeks after TV3 began broadcasting. Season 2 and Season 3 were first screened weekdays initially at 5:30pm and later moved to an earlier timeslot, season 2 and 3 were repeated several times over in 1990. Season 1 aired as lost episodes which screened on Saturday evenings at 6:00 p.m. between September and October 1990. Season 4 was picked up in 1991 with TV3 first screening the episodes that aired in the US on CBS followed by the syndicated episodes. From 1992 to 1996 TV3 screened the later seasons on Saturday mornings, the "Vacation in Europe" episodes were screened in 1993.

Broadcast UK history 
CBBC (1990–2004) 
Nickelodeon (1993–1997) 
Sky One (1990–1996) 
Fox Kids (1996–2003)

Home video releases

VHS
The series has seen numerous releases on VHS in Region 1 by Family Home Entertainment, beginning in 1988 and continuing through 1996. Several tapes were released as part of marketing promotions with corporations such as Burger King and TV Teddy.

UK videotapes were initially released using the censored Teenage Mutant Hero Turtles title.

LaserDisc
Six LaserDisc collections of selected episodes were released in North America in 1989. Releases continued through at least 1996.

DVD

Starting in April 2004, DVD releases began in region 1. The series has since seen numerous releases as part of DVD compilations.

Region 1 
Lionsgate Home Entertainment (through FHE Kids Entertainment and Family Home Entertainment) has released the entire series to DVD in Region 1. Initially it was released in volumes, with each volume containing 9–13 episodes in its original production order, with the exception of the first volume, which included bonus episodes from the last season. After six volumes, it was announced that the series would now be released in season sets, starting with season 4. However, the episodes "Once Upon a Time Machine" and the 1991 prime-time special "Planet of the Turtleoids" were omitted from the Season 5 set, but are included in the Season 10 set as bonus episodes.  The DVDs do not include the Turtle Tips PSAs.

On November 13, 2012, Lionsgate Family Entertainment released Teenage Mutant Ninja Turtles - The Complete Classic Series on DVD in Region 1.  The 23-disc set features all 193 episodes of the series as well as bonus features.  It also contains special collectors edition packaging.

On July 23, 2013, Lionsgate re-released all 47 episodes of season 3 together in a 4 disc box set.

A compilation of selected episodes, Cowabunga Classics, was released on July 29, 2014.

Region 2 
The first volume of the 25th Anniversary Edition, containing all episodes from the first two seasons in a PAL format as well as some bonus material from season 10, was released for Region 2 DVDs by Lionsgate Home Entertainment in the UK and the Republic of Ireland on May 25, 2009. 4 DVDs containing 3 episodes each based around Leonardo, Donatello, Raphael and Michaelango were released on May 19, 2014. DVDs of the series were also released by German distributor KSM GmbH between May 2007 and February 2012.

Region 4 
The show was released in Australia by Lionsgate Home Entertainment between 2009 and 2016. All episodes from the 1987 series were released in sixteen volumes. The discs are in Region 4, but unusually, they are in NTSC picture format, instead of PAL. The first six DVDs are more or less duplicated from the Region 1 discs released in America, however unlike the American release, Season 4 was broken down into several separate volumes (7 to 9).

Video on demand

United States
Lionsgate Home Entertainment has also released each of the seasons in digital format which are sold separately on several digital platforms such as Amazon and iTunes in Standard Definition only. While "Once Upon a Time Machine" is included with Season 5, "Planet of the Turtleoids" is included with Season 6.

Reception 
IGN named TMNT as the 55th best show in the Top 100 Best Animated TV Shows. While the story diverged heavily from the original conception of the Teenage Mutant Ninja Turtles with the universe of the original Mirage comics, the 1987 television series is largely the most notable and popular incarnation and drove the franchise to the phenomenal status it would achieve in popular culture. Co-creator, Peter Laird, has publicly shared his distaste with the show on numerous occasions but has also acknowledged that it was extremely successful with and beloved by its audience and, while he would have preferred a different approach to the material, it might not have been as popular as what was produced. Retroactively, the cross-over film Turtles Forever established a common multiverse continuity between all Teenage Mutant Ninja Turtles variations.

At the time, the series was criticized by various groups for its violent content and commercialism. The extensive line of toys and other licensed products also attracted criticism. The Australian Council for Children's Films and Television accused the show of being a 30-minute toy commercial.

References

External links

 
 

 
1987 American television series debuts
1996 American television series endings
English-language television shows
1980s American animated television series
1990s American animated television series
Television shows set in New York City
CBS original programming
First-run syndicated television programs in the United States
Westinghouse Broadcasting
Television series by CBS Studios
American children's animated action television series
American children's animated adventure television series
American children's animated comic science fiction television series
American children's animated drama television series
American children's animated science fantasy television series
American children's animated superhero television series
1980s American comic science fiction television series
1990s American comic science fiction television series
Martial arts television series
1980s American animated comedy television series
1990s American animated comedy television series
Television shows based on comics
Anime-influenced Western animated television series
Animated television series about turtles
Teen animated television series
Teen superhero television series